The House of Chotek was an old and influential Czech noble family in the Kingdom of Bohemia, whose members occupied many important positions within Holy Roman Empire and later in the Austro-Hungarian Empire.

History 
The family is first documented in the 14th century when Miloslav, his wife Wele and their son Wenlynus are mentioned as masters of the Chockov estate near Radnice in the Plzeň Region. The uninterrupted lineage of the family starts with Otto Chotek of Chockov and Liblín.

In the late 16th century, Václav Chotek took the name of Chotkov and Wognin, while his older brother Adam Chotek retained the name of Chockov and Liblín.

In 1685, the coat of arms of the Chotek family was joined with the coat of arms of the extinct Charwat von Bärnstein family.

On 6 February 1702, Václav Antonín Chotek of Chotkov and Vojnín was elevated to the rank of Bohemian lord. On 13 May 1743 in Laxenburg, he was awarded the title of Count (Graf, hrabě) in Bohemia. On 4 October 1745 in Frankfurt am Main, he was elevated to the rank of Reichsgraf.

Branches 
After the death of Johann Nepomuk Rudolf Chotek von Chotkov und Vojnín in 1824, the family split into four main branches created by his surviving sons:
 Branch of the descendants of Johann Nepomuk Josef Chotek von Chotkow und Wognin (1773 – 1824)
 Branch of the descendants of Josef Chotek von Chotkow und Wognin (1776 – 1809)
 Branch of the descendants of Karl, Count Chotek von Chotkow und Wognin
 Branch of the descendants of Hermann Chotek von Chotkow und Wognin (1786-1822)

The best known member of the family was Sophie, Duchess of Hohenberg, the morganatic wife of Archduke Franz Ferdinand of Austria, as his and her assassination sparked World War I.

Branch Chotek von Chockov und Liblín

Branch Chotek von Chotkov und Vojnín

Descendants of Jan Nepomuk Josef Chotek

Descendants of Josef Chotek

Descendants of Karel Chotek

Descendants of Heřman Chotek

References
Notes
When this and other Bohemian noble families' surnames and/or territorial suffixes are translated from the Czech language, particules and conjunctions are usually translated into German, rather than into English.

Citations

Sources
 Ivo Cerman: Chotkové. Příběh úřednické šlechty. Praha Lidové noviny 2008. 757p .
 Adam Wolf - Chotek - In Allgemeine Deutsche Biographie vol.4, Leipzig 1876
 The History of the Chotek Family
 Ancestors of Karl Chotek von Chotkow († 1638) 
 Ancestors of Otto Chotek von Chotkow auf Liblin († nach 1400) 
 Ancestor List 
 Roman Freiherr von Procházka: Genealogisches Handbuch erloschener böhmischer Herrenstandsfamilien, p. 54 f., Verlag Degener & Co, Neustadt (Aisch) 1973
 Bowie, Costello, Cox, Engels, Gundlach, Herr, Meyer, Rick, Ryan, Schumacher, Wagner